Tomaž Pirih (born 12 June 1981 in Jesenice) is a Slovenian rower who represented Slovenia at the 2008 Summer Olympics, Men's coxless four. His brother Miha Pirih is also an Olympic rower.

References 

Slovenian male rowers
Living people
Olympic rowers of Slovenia
Rowers at the 2004 Summer Olympics
Rowers at the 2008 Summer Olympics
1981 births
Sportspeople from Jesenice, Jesenice
21st-century Slovenian people